16th World Sports Acrobatics Championships were held in Ghent, Belgium from November 3–7, 1999.

Men's Group

Overall

Balance

Tempo

Men's Pair

Overall

Balance

Tempo

Mixed Pair

Overall

Balance

Tempo

Women's Group

Overall

Balance

Tempo

Women's Pair

Overall

Balance

Tempo

References

Acrobatic Gymnastics Championships
Acrobatic Gymnastics World Championships
International gymnastics competitions hosted by Belgium
1999 in Belgian sport